Malchik (1996 – December 2001) was a black mongrel stray dog living in Moscow, Russia. For about three years, Malchik lived at the Mendeleyevskaya station on the Moscow Metro. In 2001, he was killed when a 22-year-old woman, Yuliana Romanova, stabbed him with a kitchen knife. The incident sparked a wave of public outrage regarding the treatment of animals, and, in 2007, a monument was erected in Malchik's honour at Mendeleyevskaya station.

Life at Mendeleyevskaya station 
Malchik was a black mongrel stray dog, who lived at the Mendeleyevskaya station for about three years. He became a popular station "resident" among commuters and railway employers, who often brought him food, and he often defended his territory against drunks and other dogs.

Death
On a winter evening in December 2001, 22-year-old Yuliana Romanova (Volkova) was passing through Mendeleyevskaya station with her pet Staffordshire Bull Terrier. They encountered Malchik in a pedestrian underpass, and the stray dog barked at the pair. One report holds that Romanova set her dog on the sleeping Malchik. Romanova reached into her purse, removed a kitchen knife, and stabbed Malchik six times in the back, chest and stomach. The dog died several minutes later.

A shopkeeper from a nearby stall tried to prevent the attack, but Malchik died before the police and an ambulance arrived. The woman was said to have fled the scene and there was no formal investigation initially. However, Romanova was traced back as the killer by Irina Ozyornaya, an investigative reporter of the popular newspaper Izvestiya, who started writing articles about the incident, identifying Romanova as a young fashion model. When contacted by the reporter, Romanova reportedly shrugged off the incident. Later it was revealed that Romanova has a long history of cruelty to animals and psychiatric treatment. After a year of campaigning, however, Romanova was arrested and tried, and underwent one year of psychiatric treatment. The story of Malchik's death received widespread coverage in the Russian media.

Monument
In February 2007, a monument entitled "Compassion" (or "Sympathy") was erected at Mendeleyevskaya station. The monument was funded by public donations. A bronze sculpture of Malchik was placed on a monolithic pedestal of serpentine. It was erected on the night of 15/16 February 2007 and officially unveiled on 17 February. Among the artists responsible for the monument were sculptor Alexander Tsigal, artist Sergey Tsigal, architect Andrey Nalich, and designer Peter Nalich. The unveiling ceremony was attended by notable artists, many of whom had donated money for the monument's installation, including Andrey Makarevich, Mikhail Shirvindt, Veniamin Smekhov, Oleg Anofriev, Ludmila Kasatkina and Sergey Yursky. The Russian inscription on the monument reads " 'Compassion' is dedicated to humane relationships with homeless animals." The monument has been cited as one of Moscow's most unusual tourist attractions. As with other monuments in the Moscow metro stations, passersby rub the monument's nose for good luck.

Legacy
Joanna Bednarek wrote that Malchik's story typifies the "peculiar mix of cruelty and sentimentality present in our approach to domesticated animals, particularly dogs." In 2019, the postal department of Russia released a postage stamp portraying the Compassion monument in the memory of Malchik.

See also
Stray dogs in Moscow
List of individual dogs

References

2001 animal deaths
Animal rights movement
Dog monuments
Individual animals in Russia
Individual dogs
Moscow Metro
Deaths by stabbing in Russia